Julian Reichelt (born 15 June 1980) is a German tabloid journalist. From February 2017 to October 2021, he was chairman of the editors-in-chief and editor-in-chief digital of Bild, Germany's largest and highest-circulation tabloid. Reichelt was fired as editor-in-chief of Bild over a sexual misconduct probe, after a story about his misconduct appeared in The New York Times.

Early life and education

Julian Reichelt was born in Hamburg in 1980 and grew up in the district of Othmarschen. His mother Katrin Reichelt works as a freelance journalist on medical topics including a website on homeopathy. His father Hans-Heinrich Reichelt was an editor of the Berlin edition of the Bild and works as a freelance journalist. He founded together with his wife a publishing house for medical journalism and GLOBULIX.net
 Reichelt attended the Gymnasium Othmarschen, and graduated in the year 2000. From 2002 to 2003, he worked as a trainee for Bild before completing his training as a journalist at the Axel-Springer-Akademie.

Career
Reichelt reported from Afghanistan, Georgia, Thailand, Iraq, Sudan, and Lebanon partly as war correspondent, and worked as a culinary reporter in 2007.

In August 2015, Reichelt opposed an accreditation agreement and in his position as editor-in-chief, accused alleged IS fighters in a trial before the Higher Regional Court of Celle, only to show their pixelated faces, as their guilt had not yet been proven. As a result, Reichelt was excluded as a reporter.

In February 2016, the German Press Agency criticized Bild´s misrepresentation of Russian military operations in Syria under the title "Putin and Assad bomb on". The reference was an agreement on a ceasefire within a week. The article was said to have given an untruthful impression that Russia had broken the ceasefire that had just been decided, and was assessed to have expressed disapproval in accordance with Section 12 of the Complaints Regulation. Reichelt stated that because of this case, the German Press Agency would "make itself the stooge of the Kremlin propaganda [...]".

Legal issues 
In March 2021, a report by Spiegel announced that Reichelt would have to face an in-house investigation. Among other things, it described a "Reichelt system" of institutionalized abuse of power and the exploitation of dependent relationships with young female employees. In response, Bild publisher Axel Springer SE released a statement explaining that it was investigating "accusations of abuse of power in connection with consensual relationships and drug consumption in the workplace." In March 2021, Reichelt admitted a mixture of professional and private relationships.

On October 17, 2021, The New York Times reported about the Springer media group, also regarding the plans to take over the US media group Politico, and on the testimony of a female employee towards investigators from the law firm Freshfields whom Springer had hired for the internal inquiry. "If they find out that I'm having an affair with a trainee, I'll lose my job," Reichelt told her in November 2016 according to her testimony. Just before the editor spoke those words, another woman at the paper had lodged a sexual harassment complaint against the publisher of Bild. However, he continued the relationship, even after he was promoted to chief editor in 2017. He had her come to a hotel room near the Axel Springer high-rise in Berlin and promoted her to a management role in the newsroom. She felt overwhelmed by the leadership role in the newsroom. After she was transferred to another position in the newsroom, another editor told her that he was tired of employing women with whom Reichelt had relationships.

The New York Times article also dealt with the allegations against Reichelt that had become known in the spring and brought research into play that the Ippen Investigative Team (Frankfurter Rundschau, Münchner Merkur, TZ) had carried out over the past months and thereby gained access to internal documents. The New York Times article revealed new details of the Reichelt case. Reichelt married in 2016, and apparently forged divorce papers in order to convince one of the employees of his availability. In addition, he had instructed an additional payment of 5,000 euros for an employee, with the request not to say a word about it. However, publisher Dirk Ippen stopped the publication without giving legal or editorial reasons. Following the New York Times article, Reichelt was fired with immediate effect from Bild, Germany's largest and highest-circulation tabloid, because of new allegations made against him after the compliance proceedings.

In 2021, the Süddeutsche Zeitung reported "Döpfner's role in the Reichelt affair and his suitability as President of the Bundesverband Digitalpublisher und Zeitungsverleger will have to be examined very carefully."

Awards 
In 2008, Reichelt was awarded the Axel-Springer-Prize for young journalists in the category Supraregional / National Contributions for his report from Afghanistan"You can kill us, but never defeat us", published in two parts on 12 and 13 October 2007 in Bild.

In October 2018, Reichelt was nominated for "The Golden Potato" award from the New German Media Makers association for "particularly one-sided or unsuccessful reporting on aspects of the immigration society". Reichelt attended the ceremony but turned down the award, stating that "the word 'potato' has become an abuse of race and origin in elementary schools where migration is not a success story".

Publications

References

External links 
 

Journalists from Hamburg
Bild people
German newspaper journalists
Living people
1980 births